Spectrum360 is a NewJersey-based 501(c)(3) nonprofit serving children, teens and adults with autism and related disabilities. With locations in Livingston, West Orange, Verona and Whippany, the organization supports nearly 500 students, adults, and staff across its award-winning educational program, Academy360; adult day and vocational programs, Independence360; and two enrichment programs, FilmAcademy360 and CulinaryAcademy360. For 60 years Spectrum360’s schools and programs have provided education, socialization and therapeutic support for the individuals it serves.

References

External links
 

Private elementary schools in New Jersey
Private high schools in Essex County, New Jersey
Private middle schools in New Jersey
Verona, New Jersey